Vilkaviškis is a town in southwestern Lithuania, the administrative center of the Vilkaviškis District Municipality.

The town got its name from the Vilkauja River. Initially named Vilkaujiškis the name was later changed to an easier-to-pronounce form, Vilkaviškis.

Until 1941 the town had a large Jewish community, which was killed by the German military and their local collaborators.  

This is the town from which the 2016 cost-of-living Cauliflower Revolution originated.

Names
The names of the town as it is called or was formerly called in other languages spoken by non-Lithuanian ethnic groups which have lived or live in or around the town include: ; ; . Other spelling variants include Vilkavishkis and Wilkowyszki.

History

The town was granted city rights in 1660 by the King of Poland and Grand Duke of Lithuania, John II Casimir Vasa. The coat of arms was granted by King Augustus II the Strong in 1697. It was most likely borrowed from the Pac family, as the owner of the village at the time, Krzysztof Zygmunt Pac, was also the Chancellor of Lithuania.

During the Kościuszko Uprising, in 1794, it was the site of a battle between Polish insurgents and Prussian troops. It remained in the Polish–Lithuanian Commonwealth until 1795 when, in the Third Partition of Poland it was annexed by Prussia. In 1807, the town was incorporated into the short-lived Polish Duchy of Warsaw. On 19–23 July 1812, Napoleon Bonaparte stayed in the town. After the duchy's dissolution in 1815, the town became part of Russian-controlled Congress Poland, as part of the Augustów Voivodeship, and later Suwałki Governorate. In 1856, the vast majority of the town's population was Jewish, with 4,417 Jews and 834 Christians. During the January Uprising, on October 30, 1863, it was the site of a skirmish between Polish insurgents and Russian troops.

During World War I the town was captured by German forces and held until 1918, when the place became part of independent Lithuania.  An American-Lithuanian wrote of his observations when returning to the town in 1919:

During the interwar period a rail line was constructed running through nearby Marijampolė which caused that town to become the regional centre, replacing Vilkaviškis in its traditional role.

Shortly after the outbreak of World War II the control of the area fell to the Soviets, between 1940 and 1941, on the basis of the Molotov-Ribbentrop pact. In 1941 Nazi Germany attacked the Soviet Union, invaded Lithuania, and occupied the town. Between June and September 1941, the Germans, along with Lithuanian collaborators, destroyed almost all the houses in the town and murdered more than 3,000 people, most of them Jews.  Many of the males were shot on 28 July, and the women and children following on the Fast of Gedalia on 24 September. In March 1942, several Polish priests were imprisoned in the local seminary by the Germans, and then eventually deported to other camps in December 1942 (see Nazi persecution of the Catholic Church in Poland).

The city was the scene of a successful counter-attack by the German Panzer-Grenadier-Division Großdeutschland in the autumn of 1944 and the aftermath of the fighting was the scene of several propaganda photographs in which the name of the town was prominently featured. The town was captured by the Red Army in August 1944. After the war, it was part of the Lithuanian SSR within the Soviet Union.

When Lithuania regained its independence in 1991, the town became the capital of the newly established Vilkaviškis district municipality.

In 2020, Vilkaviškis won the Lithuania Village Flower Show, as voted by the board of Pakruojis Manor.

Notable people
The town and the surrounding district.

 Aharon April (1932–2020), a distinguished Israeli artist and sculptor.
 Jonas Basanavičius (1851–1927), an activist of the Lithuanian National Revival.
 Sonia Gaskell (1904–1974), dancer and choreographer
 Leon Kamaiky (1864–1928), American newspaper owner and publisher
 Vincas Kudirka (1858–1899), author of the Lithuanian National Anthem (born in nearby ).  
 Marian Lalewicz (1876–1944), Polish architect
 Miriam Markel-Mosessohn (1839–1920), Hebrew writer and translator
  (1939–2017), the first female diver in the Soviet navy, trainer of military dolphins.

References

External links 

 Short history 
 History of the Jewish shtetl in Vilkovishk, Lithuania
 The murder of the Jews of Vilkaviškis during World War II, at Yad Vashem website.

 Галина Александровна Шурепова

 
Municipalities administrative centres of Lithuania
Cities in Marijampolė County
Cities in Lithuania
Suwałki Governorate
Holocaust locations in Lithuania